Otterbein may refer to:

People with the surname
 Philip William Otterbein (1726-1813), German-American clergyman, founder of the Church of the United Brethren in Christ
 Keith F. Otterbein, anthropologist
 Thomas Otterbein, retired US Navy captain

Places
As a place name in the United States, at times indicating settlers that came from the United Brethren tradition:
 Otterbein, Indiana
 Otterbein, Ohio
 Otterbein, Baltimore, Maryland, a neighborhood in South Baltimore, next to Federal Hill

Other uses
 Otterbein University, Westerville, Ohio
Ottenbreit